Kinj (also Romanized as Kīnj; also known as Kīnj) is a village in Zanus Rastaq Rural District, Kojur District, Nowshahr County, Mazandaran Province, Iran. At the 2006 census, its population was 537, in 170 families. They are originally from Kermanshah and Kurdistan provinces and their language is Kurdish.

References 

Populated places in Nowshahr County